The Water in Fuel Sensor or WiF sensor indicates the presence of water in the fuel. It is installed in the fuel filter and when the water level in the water separator reaches the warning level, the Wif sends an electrical signal to the ECU or to dashboard (lamp).
The WiF is used especially in the Common Rail engines to avoid the Fuel injector damage.

The WiF sensor uses the difference of electric conductivity of water compared to diesel and gasoline to determine the presence of water. The WiF sensor can consist of two electrodes that reads the level of resistance in the fluid or between the ground and the electrode.

First generation WiF sensors use a potting resin to isolate the electronic circuit, while the latest generation of Wif sensors (the WS3 sensor in Surface-mount technology) are made totally without leakage using an innovative co-moulding process.

The latest generation of WiF sensors have a high resistance to vibrations and to thermal excursion cycles.

The main automotive WiF designer and producer is SMP Poland.

References 

Auto parts